Percy Jackson (1 April 1894 – 29 March 1959) was a former Australian rules footballer who played with South Melbourne, St Kilda and Carlton in the Victorian Football League (VFL). His year of death has also been given as 1945.

Notes

External links 
		
Percy Jackson's profile at Blueseum

		
		

1894 births
Australian rules footballers from Victoria (Australia)
Sydney Swans players
St Kilda Football Club players
Carlton Football Club players
1959 deaths